Aminocaproic acid (also known as ε-aminocaproic acid, ε-Ahx, or 6-aminohexanoic acid) is a derivative and analogue of the amino acid lysine, which makes it an effective inhibitor for enzymes that bind that particular residue. Such enzymes include proteolytic enzymes like plasmin, the enzyme responsible for fibrinolysis. For this reason it is effective in treatment of certain bleeding disorders, and it is sold under the brand name Amicar. Aminocaproic acid is also an intermediate in the polymerization of Nylon-6, where it is formed by ring-opening hydrolysis of caprolactam. The crystal structure determination showed that the 6-aminohexanoic acid is present as a salt, at least in the solid state.

Medical use
Aminocaproic acid (Amicar) is FDA-approved for use in the treatment of acute bleeding due to elevated fibrinolytic activity. It also carries an orphan drug designation from the FDA for the prevention of recurrent hemorrhage in patients with traumatic hyphema. In clinical practice, aminocaproic acid is frequently used off-label for control of bleeding in patients with severe thrombocytopenia, control of oral bleeding in patients with congenital and acquired coagulation disorders, control of perioperative bleeding associated with cardiac surgery, prevention of excessive bleeding in patients on anticoagulation therapy undergoing invasive dental procedures, and reduction of the risk of catastrophic hemorrhage in patients with acute promyelocytic leukemia.

References

Further reading

External links 
 

Amino acids
Antifibrinolytics